Atomic theory is the scientific theory that matter is composed of particles called atoms. Atomic theory traces its origins to an ancient philosophical tradition known as atomism. According to this idea, if one were to take a lump of matter and cut it into ever smaller pieces, one would eventually reach a point where the pieces could not be further cut into anything smaller. Ancient Greek philosophers called these hypothetical ultimate particles of matter atomos, a word which meant "uncut".

In the early 1800s, the scientist John Dalton noticed that chemical substances seemed to combine and break down into other substances by weight in proportions that suggested that each chemical element is ultimately made up of tiny indivisible particles of consistent weight. Shortly after 1850, certain physicists developed the kinetic theory of gases and of heat, which mathematically modelled the behavior of gases by assuming that they were made of particles. In the early 20th century, Albert Einstein and Jean Perrin proved that Brownian motion (the erratic motion of pollen grains in water) is caused by the action of water molecules; this third line of evidence silenced remaining doubts among scientists as to whether atoms and molecules were real. Throughout the nineteenth century, some scientists had cautioned that the evidence for atoms was indirect, and therefore atoms might not actually be real, but only seem to be real.

By the early 20th century, scientists had developed fairly detailed and precise models for the structure of matter, which led to more rigorously-defined classifications for the tiny invisible particles that make up ordinary matter. An atom is now defined as the basic particle that composes a chemical element. Around the turn of the 20th century, physicists discovered that the particles that chemists called "atoms" are in fact agglomerations of even smaller particles (subatomic particles), but scientists kept the name out of convention. The term elementary particle is now used to refer to particles that are actually indivisible.

History

Philosophical atomism

The idea that matter is made up of discrete units is a very old idea, appearing in many ancient cultures such as Greece and India. The word "atom", meaning "uncuttable", was coined by the Pre-Socratic Greek philosophers Leucippus and his pupil Democritus (460–370 BC). Democritus taught that atoms were infinite in number, uncreated, and eternal, and that the qualities of an object result from the kind of atoms that compose it. Democritus's atomism was refined and elaborated by the later Greek philosopher Epicurus (341–270 BC), and by the Roman Epicurean poet Lucretius (99–55 BC). During the Early Middle Ages, atomism was mostly forgotten in western Europe. During the 12th century, it became known again in western Europe through references to it in the newly-rediscovered writings of Aristotle. The opposing view of matter upheld by Aristotle was that matter was continuous and infinite and could be subdivided without limit.

In the 14th century, the rediscovery of major works describing atomist teachings, including Lucretius's De rerum natura and Diogenes Laërtius's Lives and Opinions of Eminent Philosophers, led to increased scholarly attention on the subject. Nonetheless, because atomism was associated with the philosophy of Epicureanism, which contradicted orthodox Christian teachings, belief in atoms was not considered acceptable by most European philosophers. The French Catholic priest Pierre Gassendi (1592–1655) revived Epicurean atomism with modifications, arguing that atoms were created by God and, though extremely numerous, are not infinite. He was the first person who used the term "molecule" to describe aggregation of atoms. Gassendi's modified theory of atoms was popularized in France by the physician François Bernier (1620–1688) and in England by the natural philosopher Walter Charleton (1619–1707). The chemist Robert Boyle (1627–1691) and the physicist Isaac Newton (1642–1727) both defended atomism and, by the end of the 17th century, it had become accepted by portions of the scientific community.

Dalton's law of multiple proportions

Near the end of the 18th century, two laws about chemical reactions emerged without referring to the notion of an atomic theory. The first was the law of conservation of mass, closely associated with the work of Antoine Lavoisier, which states that the total mass in a chemical reaction remains constant (that is, the reactants have the same mass as the products). The second was the law of definite proportions. First established by the French chemist Joseph Proust in 1797 this law states that if a compound is broken down into its constituent chemical elements, then the masses of the constituents will always have the same proportions by weight, regardless of the quantity or source of the original substance.

John Dalton studied data gathered by himself and other scientists and noticed a pattern that later came to be known as the law of multiple proportions. In compounds which all contain a particular element, the content of that element will differ across these compounds by ratios of small whole numbers. Dalton concluded from all this that elements react with each other in discrete and consistent units of weight. Dalton decided to call these units "atoms".

Example 1 — tin oxides: Dalton identified two oxides of tin. One is a grey powder (which Dalton referred to as the "protoxide") in which for every 100 parts of tin there is 13.5 parts of oxygen. The other oxide is a white powder (which Dalton referred to as the "deutoxide") in which for every 100 parts of tin there is 27 parts of oxygen. 13.5 and 27 form a ratio of 1:2. Dalton concluded that in the grey oxide, there is one oxygen atom for every tin atom, and in the white oxide there is two oxygen atoms for every tin atom. These oxides are today known as tin(II) oxide (SnO) and tin(IV) oxide (SnO2) respectively.

Example 2 — iron oxides: Dalton identified two oxides of iron. One is a black powder in which for every 100 parts of iron there is about 28 parts of oxygen. The other is a red powder in which for every 100 parts of iron there is 42 parts of oxygen. 28 and 42 form a ratio of 2:3. These oxides are today known as iron(II) oxide (better known as wüstite) and iron(III) oxide (the major constituent of rust).  Their formulas are Fe2O2 and Fe2O3 respectively.

Example 3 — nitrogen oxides: Dalton mentioned three oxides of nitrogen: "nitrous oxide", "nitrous gas", and "nitric acid" (these compounds are known today as nitrous oxide, nitric oxide, and nitrogen dioxide respectively).  "Nitrous oxide" is 63.3% nitrogen and 36.7% oxygen, which means it has 80 g of oxygen for every 140 g of nitrogen. "Nitrous gas" is 44.05% nitrogen and 55.95% oxygen, which means there is 160 g of oxygen for every 140 g of nitrogen. "Nitric acid" is 29.5% nitrogen and 70.5% oxygen, which means it has 320 g of oxygen for every 140 g of nitrogen. 80 g, 160 g, and 320 g form a ratio of 1:2:4. The formulas for these compounds are N2O, NO, and NO2.

Determining the atomic weights
The atomic weight of an element measures how heavy an atom of that element is compared to atoms of the other elements. Dalton and his contemporaries could not measure the absolute weight of atoms—i.e. their weight in grams—because atoms were far too small to be directly measured with what technologies existed in the 19th century. Instead, they measured how heavy atoms were relative to atoms of hydrogen, which Dalton deduced was the lightest element.

Dalton estimated the atomic weights according to the mass ratios in which they combined, with the hydrogen atom taken as unity. However, Dalton did not realize that some elements atoms exist as molecules in their natural pure form—e.g. pure oxygen exists as O2. He also mistakenly believed that the simplest compound between any two elements is always one atom of each (so he thought water was HO, not H2O). This, in addition to the crudity of his equipment, flawed his results. For instance, in 1803 he believed that oxygen atoms were 5.5 times heavier than hydrogen atoms, because in water he measured 5.5 grams of oxygen for every 1 gram of hydrogen and believed the formula for water was HO.  Adopting better data, in 1806 he concluded that the atomic weight of oxygen must actually be 7 rather than 5.5, and he retained this weight for the rest of his life.  Others at this time had already concluded that the oxygen atom must weigh 8 relative to hydrogen equals 1, if one assumes Dalton's formula for the water molecule (HO), or 16 if one assumes the modern water formula (H2O).

The flaw in Dalton's theory was corrected in principle in 1811 by Amedeo Avogadro. Avogadro had proposed that equal volumes of any two gases, at equal temperature and pressure, contain equal numbers of molecules (in other words, the mass of a gas's particles does not affect the volume that it occupies). Avogadro's law allowed him to deduce the diatomic nature of numerous gases by studying the volumes at which they reacted. For instance: since two liters of hydrogen will react with just one liter of oxygen to produce two liters of water vapor (at constant pressure and temperature), it meant a single oxygen molecule splits in two in order to form two particles of water. Thus, Avogadro was able to offer more accurate estimates of the atomic mass of oxygen and various other elements, and made a clear distinction between molecules and atoms.

Opposition to atomic theory
Dalton's atomic theory was not immediately accepted by all scientists.

One problem was the lack of uniform nomenclature.  The word "atom" implied indivisibility, but Dalton instead defined an atom as being the basic particle of any substance, which meant that "compound atoms" such as carbon dioxide could divided, as opposed to "elementary atoms". Other scientists used their own nomenclature, which only added to the general confusion. For instance, J. J. Berzelius used the term "organic atoms" to refer to particles containing three or more elements, because he thought this only existed in organic compounds.

A second problem was philosophical. Scientists in the 19th century had no way of directly observing atoms. They inferred the existence of atoms through indirect observations, such as Dalton’s law of multiple proportions. Some Scientists, notably those who ascribed to the  school of positivism, argued that scientists should not attempt to deduce the deeper reality of the universe, but only systemize what patterns they can directly observe. The anti-atomists argued that while atoms might be a useful abstraction for predicting how elements react, they do not reflect concrete reality. 

Such scientists were sometimes known as "equivalentists", because they preferred the theory of equivalent weights, which is a generalization of Proust's law of definite proportions. For example, 1 gram of hydrogen will combine with 8 grams of oxygen to form 9 grams of water, therefore the equivalent weight of oxygen is 8 grams. This position was eventually quashed by two important advancements that happened later in the 19th century: the development of the periodic table and the discovery that molecules have an internal architecture that determines their properties.

Dalton's law of multiple proportions was also shown to not be a universal law when it came to organic substances. For instance, in oleic acid there is 34 g of hydrogen for every 216 g of carbon, and in methane there is 72 g of hydrogen for every 216 g of carbon. 34 and 72 form a ratio of 17:36, which is not a ratio of small whole numbers. We know now that carbon-based substances can have very large molecules, larger than any the other elements can form. Oleic acid's formula is C18H34O2 and methane's is CH4.

Isomerism
Scientists discovered some substances have the exact same chemical content but different properties. For instance, in 1827, Friedrich Wöhler discovered that silver fulminate and silver cyanate are both 107 parts silver, 12 parts carbon, 14 parts nitrogen, and 12 parts oxygen (we now know their formulas as both AgCNO). Wöhler also discovered that  urea and ammonium cyanate both have the same composition (we now know their formulas are CH4N2O) but different properties. In 1830 Jöns Jacob Berzelius introduced the term isomerism to describe the phenomenon. In 1860, Louis Pasteur hypothesized that the molecules of isomers might have the same composition but different arrangements of their atoms.

In 1874, Jacobus Henricus van 't Hoff proposed that the carbon atom bonds to other atoms in a tetrahedral arrangement. Working from this, he explained the structures of organic molecules in such a way that he could predict how many isomers a compound could have. Consider, for example, pentane (C5H12). In van 't Hoff's way of modelling molecules, there are three possible configurations for pentane, and there really are three different substances that have the same composition as pentane but different properties.

Isomerism was not something that could be fully explained by alternative theories to atomic theory, such as radical theory and the theory of types.

Van 't Hoff argued that the chemical properties of organic molecules were determined by their physical architecture.

Mendeleyev's periodic table

Dmitri Mendeleyev noticed that when he arranged the elements in a row according to their atomic weights, there was a certain periodicity to them. For instance, the second element, lithium, had similar properties to the ninth element, sodium, and the sixteenth element, potassium — a period of seven. Likewise, beryllium, magnesium, and calcium were similar and all were seven places apart from each other on Mendeleyev's table (eight places apart on the modern table). Using these patterns, Mendeleyev predicted the existence and properties of new elements, which were later discovered in nature: scandium, gallium, and germanium. Moreover, the periodic table could predict how many atoms of other elements that an atom could bond with — e.g., germanium and carbon are in the same group on the table and their atoms both combine with two oxygen atoms each (GeO2 and CO2). Mendeleyev found these patterns to confirm the hypothesis that matter is made of atoms because it showed that the elements could be categorized by their atomic weight. Inserting a new element into the middle of a period would break the parallel between that period and the next, and would also violate Dalton's law of multiple proportions.

Brownian motion
In 1827, the British botanist Robert Brown observed that dust particles inside pollen grains floating in water constantly jiggled about for no apparent reason. In 1905, Albert Einstein theorized that this Brownian motion was caused by the water molecules continuously knocking the grains about, and developed a mathematical model to describe it. Einstein mathematically calculated the size of atoms and the number of atoms in a mole. This model was validated experimentally in 1908 by French physicist Jean Perrin.

Statistical mechanics
In order to introduce the Ideal gas law and statistical forms of physics, it was necessary to postulate the existence of atoms.  In 1738, Swiss physicist and mathematician Daniel Bernoulli postulated that the pressure of gases and heat were both caused by the underlying motion of molecules.

In 1860, James Clerk Maxwell, who was a vocal proponent of atomism, was the first to use statistical mechanics in physics. Ludwig Boltzmann and Rudolf Clausius expanded his work on gases and the laws of Thermodynamics especially the second law relating to entropy. In the 1870s, Josiah Willard Gibbs extended the laws of entropy and thermodynamics and coined the term "statistical mechanics." Einstein later independently reinvented Gibbs' laws, because they had only been printed in an obscure American journal. Einstein later commented that had he known of Gibbs' work, he would "not have published those papers at all, but confined myself to the treatment of some few points [that were distinct]."  All of statistical mechanics and the laws of heat, gas, and entropy took the existence of atoms as a necessary postulate.

Discovery of subatomic particles

Atoms were thought to be the smallest possible division of matter until 1897 when J. J. Thomson discovered the electron through his work on cathode rays.

A Crookes tube is a sealed glass container in which two electrodes are separated by a vacuum. When a voltage is applied across the electrodes, cathode rays are generated, creating a glowing patch where they strike the glass at the opposite end of the tube. Through experimentation, Thomson discovered that the rays could be deflected by an electric field (in addition to magnetic fields, which was already known). He concluded that these rays, rather than being a form of light, were composed of very light negatively charged particles. Thomson called these "corpuscles", but other scientists called them electrons, following an 1894 suggestion by George Johnstone Stoney for naming the basic unit of electrical charge.  He measured the mass-to-charge ratio and discovered it was 1800 times smaller than that of hydrogen, the smallest atom.  These corpuscles were a particle unlike any other previously known.

Thomson suggested that atoms were divisible, and that the corpuscles were their building blocks. To explain the overall neutral charge of the atom, he proposed that the corpuscles were distributed in a uniform sea of positive charge. This became known as the plum pudding model as the electrons were embedded in the positive charge like bits of fruit in a dried-fruit pudding, though Thomson thought the electrons moved about within the atom.

Discovery of the nucleus

Thomson's plum pudding model was disproved in 1909 by one of his former students, Ernest Rutherford, who discovered that most of the mass and positive charge of an atom is concentrated in a very small fraction of its volume, which he assumed to be at the very center.

Ernest Rutherford and his colleagues Hans Geiger and Ernest Marsden came to have doubts about the Thomson model after they encountered difficulties when they tried to build an instrument to measure the charge-to-mass ratio of alpha particles (these are positively-charged particles emitted by certain radioactive substances such as radium). The alpha particles were being scattered by the air in the detection chamber, which made the measurements unreliable.  Thomson had encountered a similar problem in his work on cathode rays, which he solved by creating a near-perfect vacuum in his instruments. Rutherford didn't think he'd run into this same problem because alpha particles are much heavier than electrons. According to Thomson's model of the atom, the positive charge in the atom is not concentrated enough to produce an electric field strong enough to deflect an alpha particle, and the electrons are so lightweight they should be pushed aside effortlessly by the much heavier alpha particles. Yet there was scattering, so Rutherford and his colleagues decided to investigate this scattering carefully.

Between 1908 and 1913, Rutherford and his colleagues performed a series of experiments in which they bombarded thin foils of metal with alpha particles.  They spotted alpha particles being deflected by angles greater than 90°. To explain this, Rutherford proposed that the positive charge of the atom is not distributed throughout the atom's volume as Thomson believed, but is concentrated in a tiny nucleus at the center. Only such an intense concentration of charge could produce an electric field strong enough to deflect the alpha particles as observed. Rutherford's model is sometimes called the "planetary model". However, Hantaro Nagaoka was quoted by Rutherford as the first to suggest a planetary atom in 1904. And planetary models had been suggested as early as 1897 such as the one by Joseph Larmor. Probably the earliest solar system model was found in an unpublished note by Ludwig August Colding in 1854 whose idea was that atoms were analogous to planetary systems that rotate and cause magnetic polarity.

First steps toward a quantum physical model of the atom

The planetary model of the atom had two significant shortcomings. The first is that, unlike planets orbiting a sun, electrons are charged particles. An accelerating electric charge is known to emit electromagnetic waves according to the Larmor formula in classical electromagnetism. An orbiting charge should steadily lose energy and spiral toward the nucleus, colliding with it in a small fraction of a second. The second problem was that the planetary model could not explain the highly peaked emission and absorption spectra of atoms that were observed.

 
Quantum theory revolutionized physics at the beginning of the 20th century, when Max Planck and Albert Einstein postulated that light energy is emitted or absorbed in discrete amounts known as quanta (singular, quantum). This led to a series of quantum atomic models such as the quantum model of Arthur Erich Haas in 1910 and the 1912 John William Nicholson quantum atomic model that quantized angular momentum as h/2.  In 1913, Niels Bohr incorporated this idea into his Bohr model of the atom, in which an electron could only orbit the nucleus in particular circular orbits with fixed angular momentum and energy, its distance from the nucleus (i.e., their radii) being proportional to its energy. Under this model an electron could not spiral into the nucleus because it could not lose energy in a continuous manner; instead, it could only make instantaneous "quantum leaps" between the fixed energy levels. When this occurred, light was emitted or absorbed at a frequency proportional to the change in energy (hence the absorption and emission of light in discrete spectra).

Bohr's model was not perfect. It could only predict the spectral lines of hydrogen, not those of multielectron atoms. Worse still, it could not even account for all features of the hydrogen spectrum: as spectrographic technology improved, it was discovered that applying a magnetic field caused spectral lines to multiply in a way that Bohr's model couldn't explain. In 1916, Arnold Sommerfeld added elliptical orbits to the Bohr model to explain the extra emission lines, but this made the model very difficult to use, and it still couldn't explain more complex atoms.

Discovery of isotopes

While experimenting with the products of radioactive decay, in 1913 radiochemist Frederick Soddy discovered that there appeared to be more than one variety of some elements. The term isotope was coined by Margaret Todd as a suitable name for these varieties.

That same year, J. J. Thomson conducted an experiment in which he channeled a stream of neon ions through magnetic and electric fields, striking a photographic plate at the other end. He observed two glowing patches on the plate, which suggested two different deflection trajectories. Thomson concluded this was because some of the neon ions had a different mass. The nature of this differing mass would later be explained by the discovery of neutrons in 1932: all atoms of the same element contain the same number of protons, while different isotopes have different numbers of neutrons.

Discovery of nuclear particles

In 1917 Rutherford bombarded nitrogen gas with alpha particles and observed hydrogen nuclei being emitted from the gas (Rutherford recognized these, because he had previously obtained them bombarding hydrogen with alpha particles, and observing hydrogen nuclei in the products). Rutherford concluded that the hydrogen nuclei emerged from the nuclei of the nitrogen atoms themselves (in effect, he had split a nitrogen).

From his own work and the work of his students Bohr and Henry Moseley, Rutherford knew that the positive charge of any atom could always be equated to that of an integer number of hydrogen nuclei. This, coupled with the atomic mass of many elements being roughly equivalent to an integer number of hydrogen atoms - then assumed to be the lightest particles - led him to conclude that hydrogen nuclei were singular particles and a basic constituent of all atomic nuclei. He named such particles protons. Further experimentation by Rutherford found that the nuclear mass of most atoms exceeded that of the protons it possessed; he speculated that this surplus mass was composed of previously-unknown neutrally charged particles, which were tentatively dubbed "neutrons".

In 1928, Walter Bothe observed that beryllium emitted a highly penetrating, electrically neutral radiation when bombarded with alpha particles. It was later discovered that this radiation could knock hydrogen atoms out of paraffin wax. Initially it was thought to be high-energy gamma radiation, since gamma radiation had a similar effect on electrons in metals, but James Chadwick found that the ionization effect was too strong for it to be due to electromagnetic radiation, so long as energy and momentum were conserved in the interaction. In 1932, Chadwick exposed various elements, such as hydrogen and nitrogen, to the mysterious "beryllium radiation", and by measuring the energies of the recoiling charged particles, he deduced that the radiation was actually composed of electrically neutral particles which could not be massless like the gamma ray, but instead were required to have a mass similar to that of a proton. Chadwick now claimed these particles as Rutherford's neutrons. For his discovery of the neutron, Chadwick received the Nobel Prize in 1935.

Quantum physical models of the atom

In 1924, Louis de Broglie proposed that all moving particles—particularly subatomic particles such as electrons—exhibit a degree of wave-like behavior. Erwin Schrödinger, fascinated by this idea, explored whether or not the movement of an electron in an atom could be better explained as a wave rather than as a particle. Schrödinger's equation, published in 1926, describes an electron as a wave function instead of as a point particle. This approach elegantly predicted many of the spectral phenomena that Bohr's model failed to explain. Although this concept was mathematically convenient, it was difficult to visualize, and faced opposition. One of its critics, Max Born, proposed instead that Schrödinger's wave function did not describe the physical extent of an electron (like a charge distribution in classical electromagnetism), but rather gave the probability that an electron would, when measured, be found at a particular point. This reconciled the ideas of wave-like and particle-like electrons: the behavior of an electron, or of any other subatomic entity, has both wave-like and particle-like aspects, and whether one aspect or the other is more apparent depends upon the situation.

A consequence of describing electrons as waveforms is that it is mathematically impossible to simultaneously derive the position and momentum of an electron. This became known as the Heisenberg uncertainty principle after the theoretical physicist Werner Heisenberg, who first published a version of it in 1927. (Heisenberg analyzed a thought experiment where one attempts to measure an electron's position and momentum simultaneously. However, Heisenberg did not give precise mathematical definitions of what the "uncertainty" in these measurements meant. The precise mathematical statement of the position-momentum uncertainty principle is due to Earle Hesse Kennard, Wolfgang Pauli, and Hermann Weyl.) This invalidated Bohr's model, with its neat, clearly defined circular orbits. The modern model of the atom describes the positions of electrons in an atom in terms of probabilities. An electron can potentially be found at any distance from the nucleus, but, depending on its energy level and angular momentum, exists more frequently in certain regions around the nucleus than others; this pattern is referred to as its atomic orbital. The orbitals come in a variety of shapes—sphere, dumbbell, torus, etc.—with the nucleus in the middle. The shapes of atomic orbitals are found by solving the Schrödinger equation; however, analytic solutions of the Schrödinger equation are known for very few relatively simple model Hamiltonians including the hydrogen atom and the dihydrogen cation. Even the helium atom—which contains just two electrons—has defied all attempts at a fully analytic treatment.

See also

Spectroscopy
History of molecular theory
Timeline of chemical element discoveries
Introduction to quantum mechanics
Kinetic theory of gases
Atomism
The Physical Principles of the Quantum Theory

Footnotes

Bibliography

Further reading
Charles Adolphe Wurtz (1881) The Atomic Theory, D. Appleton and Company, New York.
Alan J. Rocke (1984) Chemical Atomism in the Nineteenth Century: From Dalton to Cannizzaro, Ohio State University Press, Columbus (open access full text at http://digital.case.edu/islandora/object/ksl%3Ax633gj985).

External links

Atomism by S. Mark Cohen.
Atomic Theory - detailed information on atomic theory with respect to electrons and electricity.
The Feynman Lectures on Physics Vol. I Ch. 1: Atoms in Motion

Statistical mechanics
Chemistry theories
Foundational quantum physics
Amount of substance